Blanchard Racing Team (formerly known as Tim Blanchard Racing) is an Australian motor racing team, currently competing in the Supercars Championship. It fields a Tickford Racing built Ford Mustang, driven by Todd Hazelwood.

History

Customer Team
Tim Blanchard Racing was formed at the end of the 2016 season when Tim Blanchard purchased a Racing Entitlements Contract (REC) from Super Black Racing with the aim of continuing in the Supercars Championship, after the Britek Motorsport REC that had underpinned Blanchard's entry was taken by owner Jason Bright to Prodrive Racing Australia. Brad Jones Racing maintained the running of the entry. In 2018, the team upgraded to the Holden ZB Commodore.

After Blanchard retired from full time driving at the end of 2018, Macauley Jones took over the driving. For 2020, the team's race number was changed from No. 21 to No. 3.

Stand Alone Team

From 2021, After four seasons running as a satellite team of Brad Jones Racing, the team was renamed to Blanchard Racing Team and switched to a ex-23Red Racing Tickford-built Ford Mustang. Macauley Jones was replaced by Tim Slade.

Supercars Championship history

Drivers
The following is a list of drivers who have driven for the team in the Supercars championship, in order of their first appearance. Drivers who only drove for the team on a part-time basis are listed in italics.
 Tim Blanchard (2017–18, 2020–present)
 Todd Hazelwood (2017, 2023)
 Dale Wood (2018)
 Macauley Jones (2019–20)
 Dean Canto (2019)
 Tim Slade (2021–2022)

Car No. 3 results

Bathurst 1000 results

References

External links

Australian auto racing teams
Supercars Championship teams
2017 establishments in Australia
Auto racing teams established in 2017